Bob Stout (November 9, 1925 – July 15, 1981) was an American gymnast. He competed in eight events at the 1952 Summer Olympics.

References

External links
 

1925 births
1981 deaths
American male artistic gymnasts
Olympic gymnasts of the United States
Gymnasts at the 1952 Summer Olympics
Gymnasts from Philadelphia